Seyyed Morad may refer to:
 Seyyed Morad, Khuzestan
 Seyyed Morad, South Khorasan